Olivier Richters (born 5 September 1989) is a Dutch bodybuilder, actor, model, and the founder and CEO of Muscle Meat. Known for his imposing height of 218 cm and physique, he was the cover model of the November 2018 Netherlands' edition of Men's Health,  and subject of a documentary by the magazine. He was interviewed on Good Morning Britain in April 2019 in which his upcoming acting roles were discussed, and he revealed as his inspiration Richard Kiel, the actor of equal height who had portrayed the henchman Jaws in two James Bond films.

In 2021, Richters portrayed Ursa in the 2021 film Black Widow in a minor role. He also appeared in The King's Man and Louis Wain in 2021, and will star in Indiana Jones and the Dial of Destiny in 2023.

Richters also holds the record for the "tallest professional bodybuilder" in 2021, five inches taller than The Mountain

Filmography

Lifestyle 
Due to his size, Richters maintains a regimen of 5,000 calorie intake for filming, and 6,500 to 7,000 calories for all other purposes, within a 24 hour period. The intake is spread out in seven meals, with one of them at 3:00 a.m., and consists of carbs, rice, up to 1000 grams of various meats and vegetables, in addition to an oat shake, made of "ultra-fine oats, blended with a whey scoop". In his interview with Adil Ray at Good Morning Britain, Richters maintains that he is "pushed" to keep up with his diet.

Health
Richters was born with Pectus Excavatum, causing the bones to grow in such a way to squeeze the cardiac muscle. CT-scans revealed his heart was 20% smaller than it should have been. He underwent a procedure involving breaking the ribs and allowing the heart and lungs to continue growing, something made possible due to his still young age at the time and extending his lifespan. Richters spent six months recovering (two under morphine, his third month was spent learning to gain basic mobility-walking, cycling and swimming- and his fourth month saw a return to weightlifting).

See also 

 Bodybuilding
 Bodybuilding supplements
 Guinness World Record

References

External links
 
 The Dutch Giant at YouTube
 Muscle Meat

1989 births
Dutch bodybuilders
Dutch male voice actors
Living people